Mother Mother is a Canadian indie rock band based in Quadra Island, British Columbia. The band consists of Ryan Guldemond on guitar and vocals, Molly Guldemond and Jasmin Parkin on vocals and keyboard, Ali Siadat on drums, and Mike Young on bass. Longtime bassist Jeremy Page left the band in 2016.

In 2005, they independently released their self-titled debut album under the band name Mother. They later changed their name to Mother Mother, and re-released the album on Last Gang Records in 2008. Retitled Touch Up, the reissue also featured several new songs.

The band's second album, O My Heart, was released on September 16, 2008; their third album, Eureka, was released on March 15, 2011; their fourth album, The Sticks, was released on September 18, 2012; and their fifth album, Very Good Bad Thing was released on November 4, 2014, with an American release of April 7, 2015, on Def Jam Recordings. Their sixth album, No Culture, was released on February 10, 2017, with yet another Def Jam Recordings release in the United States.

Their seventh album, Dance and Cry, was released November 2, 2018. In late 2020, the band's music went viral on TikTok, causing a surge in streams. Their eighth studio album, Inside, was released on June 25, 2021 on Warner Brothers Music. On January 28, 2022, the band released a deluxe version of Inside, containing 7 new songs.

History

2005–2006: Early career
The band began in Heriot Bay, British Columbia in January 2005, when guitarist and vocalist Ryan Guldemond was at music school and wanted to start a band based on vocal-driven pop songs. He recruited his sister Molly along with a friend from college, Debra-Jean Creelman, to accompany his own vocals for the songs he had written, and the trio played as an acoustic act before adding drummer Kenton Loewen and bassist Jeremy Page.

The five members started off playing under the name Mother, and in the fall of 2005, they independently released a self-titled album. This debut album was recorded with Howard Redekopp, who had also worked with the New Pornographers and Tegan and Sara. When the Vancouver Province rated Mother as one of the top five BC bands to watch for in 2007, they began to receive acclaim for their debut album. Shortly thereafter, Mother landed a nationally broadcast concert opening for K'naan and the Wailin' Jennys. In the summer of 2006, they opened for the Australian band The Cat Empire at the sold-out Vancouver International Jazz Festival. Later that year, they made their debut in central Canada at the Montreal International Jazz Festival on June 29 as well as in Toronto on July 1, Canada Day, at the Harbourfront Centre.

2006–2012: Touch Up, O My Heart, and Eureka
In October 2006, after playing a set at the Pop Montreal festival, Mother met with Last Gang Records and later signed a four-album contract. At that point, the label encouraged the band to change their name to avoid legal issues, and they renamed themselves Mother Mother. On February 20, 2007, the band re-released its debut album under the new name, renaming the album Touch Up and including two new songs, as well as artwork and overdubs different from the original.

The band released their second album, O My Heart, in 2008. Later that year, on December 3, it was announced that Debra-Jean Creelman had left Mother Mother; on January 26, 2009, the band announced the addition of a new singer/keyboardist, Jasmin Parkin.

Mother Mother's third album, Eureka, was released on March 15, 2011. The album's lead single, "The Stand", entered the Canada Singles Top 100 chart in May 2011 and peaked during that week at position 76. The album prompted a reviewer at the Toronto Star to describe the band as "evolving into orchestral harmonies and hip hop-influenced power ballads, as if Adam Lambert had joined The Dirty Projectors".

On January 9, 2012, Kraft Foods launched a series of television commercials featuring the song "Bright Idea".

2012–2018: The Sticks, Very Good Bad Thing, and No Culture
Mother Mother's fourth album, The Sticks, was released on September 18, 2012. It contains 14 tracks and was co-produced by the band frontman Ryan Guldemond and producer Ben Kaplan. The first single, "Let's Fall in Love", was released on July 17. They performed this song on their Canadian tour in 2012, playing in hometown Vancouver on December 19.

In 2014, the band signed with Universal Music Canada to produce their fifth album, Very Good Bad Thing, which was released on November 4, 2014. The first single from the album, "Get Out the Way" was released on July 15, 2014.

Mother Mother played the City of Brampton, Ontario's New Year's festivities at the end of 2016.

On November 25, 2016, the band announced their Canadian No Culture Tour. Their tour began in New Brunswick in February 2017 and ended in British Columbia at the end of March 2017.

On February 10, 2017, their sixth album No Culture was released. The lead single from the album, "The Drugs", was released on November 4, 2016.

2018–present: Dance and Cry and Inside
On November 2, 2018, the band released their seventh studio album Dance and Cry. The first single from the album, "Get Up", was released on September 14, 2018. The band supported the album with the Dance and Cry tour, playing 26 shows across North America, starting on February 7, 2019 in Vancouver and ending March 16, 2019 in Buffalo, New York. The tour included a sold out show at New York's Gramercy Theatre.

Recently, songs from their 2008 album, O My Heart, went viral on the video-sharing platform TikTok starting in late 2020, causing their music to reach new streaming highs. The songs, in particular "Hayloft", "Arms Tonite", and "Wrecking Ball", became popular, with videos including cosplay and gothic fashion. Although no particular event caused the surge, the band's music did resonate with non-binary communities, as users played Mother Mother songs while discussing gender-related topics. Lead vocalist, Ryan Guldemond, described the surge as a "high honor and huge compliment whenever it's suggested that our music might serve as an adequate soundtrack to a courageous journey of self-discovery that often rubs against societal norms". Guldemond further reiterated that their early music "really struggled to fit neatly into the industry standards of either a rock or pop format [...] I sang straight from my throat and had a much more androgynous tone. It was very rich with unisexual harmonies, as well as eccentric, quirky, daring lyrics. Perhaps it's just the right time for people to understand that music".

Although the band had not planned on making new music, in October 2020, they stated to Rolling Stone that they were completing their eighth album at The Warehouse Studio in Vancouver. Dubbed a "pandemic album", it will contain the "energy from the earlier catalog". On March 9, 2021, Mother Mother released the singles "I Got Love" and "Stay Behind". On April 8, 2021, Mother Mother announced their eighth studio album Inside, due for release on June 25 on Warner Brothers Music. The band also released a video for "I Got Love" made up of clips sent in by fans. They released their following single from Inside, "Sick of the Silence", on June 10, 2021. Alongside the release of Inside, the band announced the Canadian leg of the Inside tour, which began on December 2, 2021 in Vancouver and ended on May 20, 2022 in Ottawa.

In November 2022, Mother Mother released a single titled "Cry Christmas", along with a cover of "Have Yourself a Merry Little Christmas". The single was described by the band on Twitter as "a holiday song for the holiday-disenfranchised".

Band members

Current members
 Ryan Guldemond – lead vocals, guitar (2005–present), bass (2005–2006)
 Molly Guldemond – vocals, keyboards (2005–present)
 Jasmin Parkin – vocals, keyboards (2009–present)
 Ali Siadat – drums, percussion (2008–present)
 Mike Young – bass (2016–present)

Former members
 Debra-Jean Creelman – vocals, keyboards (2005–2009)
 Kenton Loewen – drums, percussion (2006–2008)
 Jeremy Page – bass (2006–2016)

Timeline

Discography

Studio albums

Singles

Other charting songs

Videography

References

External links 
 Official website

Musical groups established in 2005
Canadian indie rock groups
Musical groups from British Columbia
2005 establishments in British Columbia
Island Records artists
Universal Music Group artists
Warner Music Group artists